Consuelo Monsegur is an Argentine sports sailor. At the 2008 Summer Olympics she competed in the Women's 470 class with Maria Fernanda Sesto.  They finished in 16th place.  At the 2012 Summer Olympics she competed in the same event with the same teammate.  They finished in 13th place.

References

Argentine female sailors (sport)
Living people
Olympic sailors of Argentina
Sailors at the 2008 Summer Olympics – 470
Sailors at the 2012 Summer Olympics – 470
Year of birth missing (living people)